The Haunted Melody is the first studio album by the English jazz group Steve Howe Trio, released in November 2008 on HoweSound.

Track listing

 "Kenny's Sound" (4:38) (Kenny Burrell)
 "Mood for a Day" (5:46) (Steve Howe)
 "The Haunted Melody" (4:33) (Roland Kirk)
 "Siberian Khatru" (5:02) (Jon Anderson, Steve Howe, Rick Wakeman)
 "Blue Bash" (6:08) (Jimmy Smith)
 "Momenta" (7:32) (Steve Howe)
 "Laughing With Larry" (3:36) (Steve Howe)
 "Travelin'" (5:02) (Kenny Burrell)
 "Dream River" (5:36) (Steve Howe)
 "Close to the Edge" (4:49) (Jon Anderson, Steve Howe)
 "Sweet Thunder" (4:53) (Steve Howe)

Personnel
 Steve Howe – guitar
 Dylan Howe – drums
 Ross Stanley – Hammond organ

References
 

Steve Howe (musician) albums
2008 albums